Jan Kuchta (born 8 January 1997) is a Czech professional footballer who plays as a forward for Czech club Sparta Prague, on loan from Lokomotiv Moscow, and the Czech Republic national team.

Club career

Slavia Prague
Kuchta made his Czech First League debut for Slavia Prague on 8 November 2015 in a game against Bohemians.

In January 2019, he joined Teplice on loan until June 2020.

In February 2020, Kuchta signed for Slovan Liberec on a permanent deal, following a loan move at the club. In July 2020, Kuchta re-signed for Slavia Prague. Kuchta finished the 2020–21 Czech First League as joint top scorer, alongside Adam Hložek with 15 goals. In the final match of the season on 29 May 2021, Kuchta scored his side's winning goal against Dynamo České Budějovice which confirmed an undefeated league season for Slavia, the first time a Czech club reached this milestone since rivals Sparta Prague did so in 2009–10.

Lokomotiv Moscow
On 12 January 2022, Kuchta signed a contract with Russian Premier League club Lokomotiv Moscow until 2026.

He made his league debut for Lokomotiv on 6 March 2022 against FC Khimki and scored the winning goal in a 3–2 victory. However, he never served a disqualification that he received for getting sent off in his last game for Slavia, and, according to FIFA regulations, was not eligible to play, FC Khimki filed a protest. The protest was denied on 10 March 2022, according to Russian Football Union, Kuchta should have been disqualified for the Russian Cup game Lokomotiv played against Yenisey Krasnoyarsk on 3 March and lost 4–0, as Czech regulations extend disqualifications to Cup games, even though Russian regulations do not, so he was technically disqualified for "one league or Cup game" as opposed to "one league game". Lokomotiv did not provide the document detailing the disqualification to the league, the club claimed they did not receive it during the transfer, and he was allowed by the RFU to play in the Cup game. His disqualification is considered served after that game, even though he actually played in it, as per FIFA regulations. Khimki considered lodging an appeal.

Sparta Prague (loan)
In June 2022, Kuchta joined Sparta Prague on a one-year long loan with an option for a permanent transfer. In his first match for Sparta Prague in the Czech First League (2–1 home loss against Slovan Liberec) he stepped on Liberec goalkeeper Olivier Vliegen's head and received a yellow card, which the referee changed to a red card after he saw video footage. Kuchta was banned for five league matches by LFA Disciplinary Commission. The club with Kuchta appealed against his ban, but the appeal was rejected by Appeals Committee on 11 August 2022.

International career
Kuchta made his debut for the Czech Republic national team on 8 October 2021 in a 2022 FIFA World Cup qualifier against Wales.

Career statistics

Club

International

Scores and results list Czech Republic's goal tally first, score column indicates score after each Kuchta goal.

Honours
Slavia Prague
Czech First League: 2020–21
Czech Cup: 2020–21

Individual
Czech First League top scorer: 2020–21

References

External links
 
 
 National Team profile

1997 births
Living people
Sportspeople from Liberec
Czech footballers
Association football forwards
Czech Republic international footballers
Czech Republic under-21 international footballers
Czech Republic youth international footballers
Czech First League players
Czech National Football League players
Russian Premier League players
SK Slavia Prague players
Bohemians 1905 players
FK Viktoria Žižkov players
1. FC Slovácko players
FK Teplice players
FC Slovan Liberec players
FC Lokomotiv Moscow players
AC Sparta Prague players
Czech expatriate footballers
Czech expatriate sportspeople in Russia
Expatriate footballers in Russia